Los Compadres full title Los Compadres: La Perfecta Ocasión was a collective album by Los Compadres made up of three musical stars of Puerto Rico, Valentino (of the duo Magnate & Valentino and Mario VI and Gocho) released on December 5, 2006

Track list
"Tu Tiguere" (Valentino, Gocho & Mario VI (3:40)
"Dale Mas Bass" (Valentino) (3:27)
"Tu Primera Vez" (Mario VI) (2:59)
"La Perfecta Ocasión" (Valentino, Gocho & Mario VI (3:15)
"Tu Vicio" (Valentino) (4:38)
"Dos Amantes, Dos Amigos" (Mario VI) (2:50)
"Tu Quieres" (Valentino) (4:11)
"Si Ella Pide" (Valentino, Gocho & Mario VI (3:51)
"Corazón Salvaje" (Mario VI) (3:36)
"Es Asi" (Valentino, Gocho & Mario VI (4:05)
"Se Nos Acaba el Tiempo" (Mario VI & Gocho) (3:25)

Sources
iTunes: Los Compadres - La Perfecta Ocasión - Gocho, Mario VI & Valentino

2006 debut albums